Nane  was an Armenian mother goddess, as well as the goddess of war and wisdom.

Nane was depicted as a young beautiful woman in the clothing of a warrior, with spear and shield in hand,
like the Hellenic Athena, with whom she identified in the Hellenic period.

She has also been referred to as Hanea, Hanea, Babylonian Nana, Sumerian Nanai.

Cult
Her cult was closely associated with the cult of the goddess Anahit.

The temple of the goddess Nane was in the town of Thil across from the Lycus River. Her temple was destroyed during the Christianization of Armenia:

"Then they crossed the Lycus River and demolished the temple of Nane, Aramazd's daughter, in the town of Thil.""Gregory then asked the king for permission to overthrow and destroy the pagan shrines and temples. Trdat readily issued an edict entrusting Gregory with this task, and himself set out from the city to destroy shrines along the highways."

According to some authors, Nane was adopted from the Akkadian goddess Nanaya, from the Phrygian goddess Cybele, or was from Elamite origin.

Traditions and symbols
As the conversion to Christianity was so forceful, most artifacts, books, and stories were destroyed. As a result, many things are unknown to contemporary scholars.

It is however known that in Ancient Armenia, it was traditional for Kings to meet with the oldest woman in their dynasty because she was often seen as the epitome of Nane. In Armenia and other countries around the world, the name Nane continues to be used not only as a personal name, but also as a nickname for the grandmother of the household. Nanna, Nani, Nannan, etc.

See also 
 Anahit
 Aramazd
Nana (disambiguation)

References

Bibliography 

Wisdom goddesses
Armenian goddesses
War goddesses
Mother goddesses
Persecution of Pagans